The 1988 Virginia Slims of Nashville was a women's tennis tournament played on indoor hard courts at the Maryland Farms Racquet Club in Brentwood, Tennessee in the United States and was part of Category 2 tier of the 1988 WTA Tour. It was the fourth edition of the tournament and ran from October 17 through October 23, 1988. Unseeded Susan Sloane won the singles title and earned $17,000 first-prize money.

Finals

Singles

 Susan Sloane defeated  Beverly Bowes 6–3, 6–2
 It was Sloane's only title of the year and the 1st of her career.

Doubles

 Jenny Byrne /  Janine Tremelling defeated  Elise Burgin /  Rosalyn Fairbank 7–5, 6–7, 6–4
 It was Byrne's only title of the year and the 2nd of her career. It was Tremelling's only title of the year and the 2nd of her career.

References

External links
 ITF tournament edition details
 Tournamemnt draws

Virginia Slims of Nashville
Virginia Slims of Nashville
Virginia Slims of Nashville
Virginia Slims of Nashville
Virginia Slims of Nashville